is a Japanese tarento and idol. She is a former member of the girl group AKB48 under Team 4 and of AKB48's subgroup Tentoumu Chu!.

She is now a solo tarento and idol represented by Twin Planet, and formerly worked part-time at a yakiniku restaurant owned by fellow former AKB48 member Mayumi Uchida for a short period of time after graduation from AKB48.

She is currently active as a tarento, appearing on several variety programs. Her persona on-screen is associated with exaggerated movements and reactions, a style that is similar to Nana Suzuki, who is a senior at her agency Twin Planet Entertainment.

On November 22, 2022, Nishino announced her marriage to Gokuraku Tombo and Yoshimotozaka46 member Keiichi Yamamoto. After her marriage to Gokuraku Tombo and Yoshimotozaka46 member Keiichi, she decided to changed her name from “Nishino Miki” to “Miki Yamamoto” (山本美希、Yamamoto Miki).

Discography

AKB48 singles

Appearances

Dramas
 Joshikou Keisatsu (October 27, 2013 – March 17, 2014, Fuji TV)
 Sailor Zombie (June 7, 2014, episode 7, TV Tokyo) as Zombie girl
 Majisuka Gakuen 4 as Over (February 17, 2015, episode 6, Nippon TV)
 Majisuka Gakuen 5 as Chicken (October 6, 2015, episode 9, Hulu)

Television programs
 Ariyoshi AKB Kyōwakoku (November 19, 2012 – present, TBS)
 AKBingo! (June 25, 2013 – present, NTV)
 AKB48 Nemousu TV (September 15, 2013 – present, Family Gekijo)
 AKB48 Show! (October 5, 2013 – present, NHK)

Radio
 AKB48 no All Night Nippon (October 18, 2013, Nippon Broadcasting System)

References

External links 
 Twin Planet official profile 
 
 

1999 births
Living people
Japanese women pop singers
Japanese idols
AKB48 members
Musicians from Shizuoka Prefecture
21st-century Japanese women singers
21st-century Japanese singers